Eduardo Alonso Armenta Palma (born 16 December 2001) is a Mexican professional footballer who plays as a midfielder for Liga MX club Tijuana.

Career statistics

Club

References

2001 births
Living people
Association football midfielders
Dorados de Sinaloa footballers
Ascenso MX players
Liga Premier de México players
Tercera División de México players
Footballers from Sinaloa
Mexican footballers